Donald J. McKenzie (born November 5, 1957) is a Canadian curler,  and ; he is a two-time Brier champion.

Awards
Canadian Curling Hall of Fame: 1993 (as "MacKenzie, Donald J. 'Don'")
Alberta Sports Hall of Fame: 1999 (with all Pat Ryan team 1985–1989)

Teams

Personal life
He started curling in 1970 when he was 13 years old.

References

External links
 
 Donald McKenzie – Curling Canada Stats Archive
 1993 Ice Hot International #40 Don McKenzie | The Trading Card Database
 Video:  (full game)

Living people
1957 births
Curlers from Edmonton
Canadian male curlers
Brier champions